Guillaume Tirel, known as Taillevent (French: "wind-cutter" i.e. an idle swaggerer) (born ca. 1310 in Pont-Audemer – 1395), was an important figure in the early history of French cuisine. He was cook to the Court of France at the time of the first Valois kings and the Hundred Years' War. His first position was enfant de cuisine (kitchen boy) to Queen Jeanne d'Évreux. From 1326 he was queux, head chef, to Philip VI. In 1347, he became squire to the Dauphin de Viennois and his queux in 1349. In 1355 he became squire to the Duke of Normandy, in 1359 his queux and in 1361 his serjeant-at-arms. The Duke of Normandy became Charles V in 1368 and Tirel continued in his service. From 1381 he was in service to Charles VI. Guillaume Tirel is generally considered one of the first truly "professional" master chefs. He died in 1395 at around 80 years of age. 

He expanded a collection of recipes as Le Viandier, a famous book on cookery and cookery technique, thought to be one of the first professional treatises written in France and upon which the French gastronomic tradition was founded. The book is split into three sections. One outlines the proper way to present a dish, another focuses on using spices in dishes and the third highlights the importance of separating meat and fish from sauces when preparing a dish. It had an inestimable influence on subsequent books on French cuisine and is important to food historians as a detailed source on the medieval cuisine of northern France. During the reign of Philip VI, Taillevent was a major influence in the rise of courtly favor for the strong red wines being produced in the south of France as well as those coming out of Burgundy. Editions of Le Viandier may be found in the Library of Congress and other public collections.

Guillaume Tirel is still influencing cooking around the modern world. Today, many restaurants named "Taillevent" capitalize on the reputation of Guillaume Tirel. "Guillaume Tirel" was also the name of a catering business in Brussels (1989–1999).  Additionally, there is a hospitality school, the Lycée Hôtelier Guillaume Tirel, which has 4 training restaurants and focuses their practices on the foundations of Guillaume Tirel's work in Le Viander.

He was buried in a tombstone created to show him wearing armour and carrying three cooking pots and a shield.

See also 
 Medieval cuisine

Footnotes

References 
 Johnson, Hugh, Vintage: The Story of Wine. Simon and Schuster, 1989.
Viandier of Taillevent: An Edition of All Extant Manuscripts. University of Ottawa Press, 1988. 
Le Viandier de Guillaume Tirel dit Taillevent, le Baron Jérôme Pichon et Georges Vicaire, Paris, 1892 (reprint by Slatkine Reprints, Genève, 1967).
 Online version of Le Viandier, translated by James Prescott: http://www.telusplanet.net/public/prescotj/data/viandier/viandier1.html

External links
 
 

1310 births
1395 deaths
French chefs
French food writers
French male non-fiction writers